Michael Anthony Colman (August 4, 1968 – April 5, 1994) was an American ice hockey defenseman who played fifteen games for the San Jose Sharks in the 1991–92 NHL season. He was born in Stoneham, Massachusetts.

Colman died as a result of injuries suffered in a car accident in Kansas City on April 5, 1994, while playing for the Kansas City Blades of the International Hockey League.

Career statistics

See also
List of ice hockey players who died during their playing career

External links

1968 births
1994 deaths
American men's ice hockey defensemen
Ferris State Bulldogs men's ice hockey players
Kansas City Blades players
People from Stoneham, Massachusetts
San Jose Sharks players
Ice hockey players from Massachusetts
Road incident deaths in Missouri
Undrafted National Hockey League players
Sportspeople from Middlesex County, Massachusetts